Joseph or Joe Walter may refer to:

 Joseph Walter (1783–1856), British marine artist
 Joe Walter (American football) (born 1963), former American football tackle
 Joe Walter (footballer) (1895–1995), former British professional footballer
 Joe Walter (politician) (born 1947), former member of the Ohio House of Representatives

See also